The Equestrian Competition at the 2009 Mediterranean Games was held in Pescara, Italy.

Individual Jumping

Team Jumping

Medal table

References
 

Sports at the 2009 Mediterranean Games
2009
2009 in equestrian
Equestrian sports competitions in Italy